Pseudosphaerodes is a genus of beetles in the family Carabidae, containing the following species:

 Pseudosphaerodes rhodopus (Bates, 1892)
 Pseudosphaerodes sphaerodoides (Alluaud, 1917)
 Pseudosphaerodes sulcatus (Eschscholtz, 1833)

References

Licininae